Jinghe Subdistrict is a subdistrict in Dongxihu District, Wuhan, Hubei, China. , it administers the following fifteen residential communities: 
Shizi Road Community
Mintian Community
Yongfeng Community
Xianfeng Community
Xinhe Community
Xihu Community
Guantangjiao Community
Shijiapo Community
Daoxiang Community
Lianhuahu Community
Haijingbeiqu Community
Dianli Community
Jinlongwan Community
Sailuocheng Community
Changdundi Community

See also 
 List of township-level divisions of Hubei

References 

Township-level divisions of Hubei
Geography of Wuhan
Subdistricts of the People's Republic of China